Atatlahuca (Atatláhuca) may refer to:

San Esteban Atatlahuca
San Juan Bautista Atatlahuca
Atatláhuca–San Miguel Mixtec language